Northern United All Stars is a Saint Lucian football club based in Gros Islet, competing in the Saint Lucia Gold Division, the top tier of Saint Lucian football.

The club participated in the 2011 CFU Club Championship, playing in the first elimination stage of the Preliminary phase. There, Northern United took on the Surinamese Hoofdklasse runners-up, Walking Bout Company. In the tournament, they were eliminated 6–1 on aggregate, losing 3–0 at home to WBC, and 3–1 at WBC.

Current squad
The following squad was used in the 2011 CFU Club Championship, according to CONCACAF reports.

as of 26 March 2011

Performance in International Competitions 

Northern United's score listed first.

 2005 CFU Club Championship
First Round v.  Positive Vibes – 0:2, 5:0
Quarter-finals v.  Victory Boys – 1:1, 1:0
Semi-finals v.  Robinhood – 1:3, 2:4

 2011 CFU Club Championship
First Stage v.  Walking Bout Company – 0:3, 1:3

References 

Northern United All Stars